The Light aircraft pilot licence (LAPL) is a pilot license allowing the pilot to fly small aircraft. Unlike most other licences, it is not covered by the ICAO framework and is usually not able to be used in other states or regulatory areas.

European Union and EASA member states 
The EU LAPL is defined in the  Regulation (EU) No. 1178./2011. Compared to the ICAO licence on the level of a PPL the requirements, skill tests, and privileges are lowered. The rules and requirements for the license are stated in Part-FCL of the Regulation (EU) No. 1178./2011.

United Kingdom 
In the United Kingdom, the LAPL is regulated under UK Part-FCL.

Recency requirements
To use the licence, an LAPL holder needs to have, in the last 24 months, as pilot of an aeroplane or TMG:
12 hours of flight time as pilot in charge, including 12 take-offs and landings,
refresher training of at least 1 hour of total flight time with an instructor.

References

Aviation licenses and certifications

U.K. Regulation (EU) No. 1178/2011